Jus disponendi, in the civil law, refers to the right of disposing (of a thing owned, i.e. it is an attribute of dominium, or ownership).  An expression used either:
generally, to signify the right of alienation, as historically a married woman would be deprived of the jus disponendi over her separate estate;
specially, in the law relating to sales of goods, where it is often a question whether the vendor of goods has the intention of reserving to himself the jus disponendi; i. e., of preventing the ownership from passing to the purchaser, notwithstanding that he (the vendor) has parted with the possession of the goods.

See also
Ius

References
Black's Law Dictionary (Second Edition 1910) (public domain)

Latin legal terminology